Daniel Omar Márquez Palacios (born January 18, 1987, in Manzanillo, Colima, Mexico) is a Mexican former professional footballer.

Club career
Daniel also played for Reboceros de La Piedad, Morelia Manzanillo. All of these teams are in Primera División A. He played with Fernando Luviano "Cabinnho", one of his best friends.

He made his debut against Club Necaxa. Later, he only played 2 games for the rest of Apertura 2007.  He began to play in Clausura in 2008. He scored his first goal in the Copa Libertadores against U. San Martín.

On December 29, 2010, Daniel Marquez scored his first goal in an International team Guatemala with Club América. Later that night, they won the game 4-1 and received the Copa Insurgentes.

Honours
América
InterLiga: 2008
Copa Insurgentes: 2010

References

External links
Pasionaguila Blog y Noticias al minuto del Club América
 

1987 births
Living people
Sportspeople from Manzanillo, Colima
Footballers from Colima
Liga MX players
Club América footballers
Club Necaxa footballers
Association football forwards
Mexican footballers